Rough Romance is a 1930 American lumberjack Western film directed by A. F. Erickson. The film stars George O'Brien, Helen Chandler, Antonio Moreno, Roy Stewart, and Harry Cording and a 23-year-old John Wayne had a minor uncredited role.

Plot

Cast
George O'Brien as Billy West
Helen Chandler as Marna Reynolds
Antonio Moreno as Loup La Tour
Roy Stewart as Sheriff Milt Powers
Harry Cording as Chick Carson
David Hartford as "Dad" Reynolds
Noel Francis as Flossie
Frank Lanning as Pop Nichols
John Wayne as Lumberjack (uncredited)

While Wayne had a bit part in this film and also worked on props, he was not given a props credit as shown by some sources. If he had been, he would have been the first and only props worker given an on-film credit in 1930.

See also
 John Wayne filmography

External links

1930 films
1930 Western (genre) films
American black-and-white films
American Western (genre) films
Fox Film films
Films about lumberjacks
1930s English-language films
1930s American films